Márcio Carlos Marinho (born 12 December 1970) is a Brazilian politician. Although born in Rio de Janeiro, he has spent his political career representing Bahia, having served as state representative since 2008.

Personal life
Marinho was born to Arindo Carlos Marinho and Izabel Rodrigues Marinho. He grew up in a poor household and two of his brothers drowned when he was 14. Prior to becoming a politician Marinho worked as a communicator and public manager. Marinho identifies as an Afro-Brazilian and as an Evangelical Christian. He is an ordained bishop of the Universal Church of the Kingdom of God.

Political career
Marinho voted in favor of the impeachment against then-president Dilma Rousseff and political reformation. He would later vote in against opening a corruption investigation against Rousseff's successor Michel Temer, and voted in favor of the 2017 Brazilian labor reforms.

References

1970 births
Living people
People from Cabo Frio
Republicans (Brazil) politicians
Liberal Party (Brazil, 2006) politicians
Members of the Chamber of Deputies (Brazil) from Bahia
Members of the Legislative Assembly of Bahia
Brazilian politicians of African descent
Brazilian evangelicals
Brazilian Pentecostal pastors
Members of the Universal Church of the Kingdom of God